Brackney is an unincorporated community in Susquehanna County, Pennsylvania, United States. Brackney has a post office with ZIP code 18812. Brackney is known for its many picturesque lakes, including Quaker Lake, Laurel Lake, Cranberry Lake, Lake Sophia, Silver Lake, and Lake Marge.

References

Unincorporated communities in Susquehanna County, Pennsylvania
Unincorporated communities in Pennsylvania